Tahrir 2011: The Good, the Bad and the Politician is an Egyptian documentary directed by Tamer Ezzat, Ahmad Abdalla, Ayten Amin and Amr Salama. The film is divided in three parts covering respectively the protesters, the police forces and a profile of Hosni Mubarak by several political figures. The film mixes interviews and real footage from the demonstrations. It premiered at 68th Venice International Film Festival as an out of competition feature film and the 2011 Toronto International Film Festival in the Mavericks section.

See also
The Square, a 2013 Egyptian-American documentary film

References

External links
 

2011 films
Egyptian documentary films
2011 documentary films
2010s Arabic-language films
Documentary films about the Arab Spring
Egyptian revolution of 2011